Ostrinotes tarena is a species of butterfly, described by William Chapman Hewitson in 1874, belonging to the family Lycaenidae. It is found in French Guiana and Guyana.

References
 ZipcodeZoo

Butterflies described in 1874
Theclinae
Lycaenidae of South America
Taxa named by William Chapman Hewitson